Westminster Seminary California is a Reformed and Presbyterian Christian seminary in Escondido, California. It was initially a branch campus of Westminster Theological Seminary in Philadelphia until 1982 when it became fully independent. It currently has thirteen full-time faculty members and enrolls approximately 155 full-time students.

History and ecclesiastical affiliation
Westminster Seminary California was founded in 1979 and welcomed its first students in the fall of 1980. It is a multi-denominational seminary in the Presbyterian and Reformed tradition, with close relationships with several denominations, including the Presbyterian Church in America, Orthodox Presbyterian Church, United Reformed Churches in North America and Korean-American Presbyterian Church.

Escondido Orthodox Presbyterian Church

The Escondido Orthodox Presbyterian Church worships in the WSC Chapel.  The congregation was founded in 2002 and has about 100 members. A number of members of the faculty are members of the congregation. The Pastor is Zach Keele, a Westminster graduate.

Academics
Westminster Seminary California is accredited by the Western Association of Schools and Colleges and was first accredited by the Association of Theological Schools in the United States and Canada in 1997. The seminary currently offers a Master of Arts degree and a Master of Divinity degree.

Theology
Westminster Seminary California is associated with the Reformed Two kingdoms doctrine. Andrew Sandlin has called this the "Escondido Theology".

Notable faculty
Past and present notable faculty members include:
 R. Scott Clark
 Edmund Clowney
 John Frame
 W. Robert Godfrey
 D. G. Hart
 Michael Horton
 Meredith Kline
H. David Schuringa
 David M. VanDrunen

Notable alumni

 Joel Kim, president of Westminster Seminary California
 Julius Kim, president of The Gospel Coalition
 Lloyd Kim, coordinator of Mission to the World
 Matt Slick, founder of Christian Apologetics and Research Ministry

References

External links 
 Official website

 
Seminaries and theological colleges in California
Educational institutions established in 1979
Reformed church seminaries and theological colleges
Presbyterian universities and colleges in the United States
Schools accredited by the Western Association of Schools and Colleges
Education in Escondido, California
1979 establishments in California